Julio Pedro Curatella (27 February 1911 – 1995) was an Argentine rower who competed in the 1936 Summer Olympics.

In 1936 he won the bronze medal with his partner Horacio Podestá in the coxless pairs competition.

Twelve years later he was a member of the Argentine boat which was eliminated in the repêchage of the coxless four event.

External links
Julio Curatella's profile at databaseOlympics.com
Julio Curatella's profile at Sports Reference.com

Argentine people of Italian descent
1911 births
1995 deaths
Argentine male rowers
Olympic rowers of Argentina
Rowers at the 1936 Summer Olympics
Rowers at the 1948 Summer Olympics
Olympic bronze medalists for Argentina
Olympic medalists in rowing
Medalists at the 1936 Summer Olympics